The Würth Group is a worldwide wholesaler of fasteners, screws and screw accessories, dowels, chemicals, electronic and electromechanical components, furniture and construction fittings, tools, machines, installation material, automotive hardware, inventory management, storage and retrieval systems. The group of over 400 companies across 80+ countries has been servicing the Automotive, Woodworking, Metalworking, Industrial and Construction industries with a strong presence across Europe.

The Würth Companies of North America have been servicing and distributing to the Automotive, Industrial and Woodworking Industries for over 50 years. From body shops to fleet garages, Wurth USA and Würth Canada are leading suppliers of high-quality products and services for the automotive aftermarket, transportation maintenance and repair industry. Würth's North American Wood Division companies supply the cabinetry and woodworking professional. The North American Wood Division is made up of Würth Baer Supply, Würth Louis and Company, Würth Wood Group, Dakota Premium Hardwoods, and McFadden's Hardwoods and Hardware.  Würth Industry of North America specializes in the creation and management of vendor managed inventory programs for industrial production. With 420,000 line items available, Würth Industry of North America is one of the most complete C parts supplier in the industry. In 2023, Würth will be offering select products in North America's largest retail stores.

Würth was founded in 1945 by Adolf Würth in Künzelsau, Germany. The company has been run by his son Reinhold Würth since 1954.

History
Würth was founded by Adolf Würth (1909–1954), established for the purpose of selling screws in 1945 in Künzelsau (hence the company logo, which consists of the family name and a W of two screw heads with cylindrical and round heads). After the death of Adolf Würth, his son Reinhold Würth took over in 1954 at the age of 19 with his mother Alma Würth, making it a two-person company.

Since then, the company has become the world's leading retail group with the main business share in the distribution of fasteners and tools with approximately 125,000 different products in these lines. Its more than 3,9 million customers include companies from the construction industry, wood and metal crafting, automotive companies, and, increasingly, industrial customers.

Today the Würth Group operates worldwide and employs over 81,000 people, making it one of the largest non-listed companies in Germany. The German newspaper Die Welt listed it as 91 on its list of top 500 companies.

On 1 January 1994, Reinhold Würth withdrew from management and took over as Chairman of the Würth Advisory Board. On March 1, 2006, he passed on this office to his daughter Bettina Würth and became Chairman of the Supervisory Board of the Würth Group.

On 27 October 2006, after five years of research, the group opened a production plant in Schwäbisch Hall  for new types of solar cells using copper, indium, and selenium instead of silicon.

Unlike other trading companies, Würth spends much on research and development. It set a record in 2007 with more than 60 patents.

Corporate structure
Besides the German parent company Adolf Würth GmbH & Co, Würth includes more than 400 companies in 86 countries, which are divided into two lines:

The Würth Line (die Würth-Linie), whose companies carry the Würth name
206 allied companies, which are usually purchased companies that operate under their original name or have been integrated into another allied company

The Würth Group specializes in sales through its representatives. It operates globally, with continuous expansions due to sales. In Germany, the number of employees amounts to 24,971. Around the world, the Würth Group employs more than 33,000 sales representatives in the field.

Corporate culture
At Würth, employees can earn bonuses through a differentiated reward system. The group companies and foreign sales companies are largely autonomous in their tasks, although they report their results to the parent company. Würth has also allowed its staff to select architects and planning representative administration to choose the best options for themselves.

Cultural ties
The Würth Group supports the Würth Foundation (Stiftung Würth), established by Carmen and Reinhold Würth in 1987 to promote art and culture, science and research, education and integration. The organization gives many types of awards, including the Würth Prize for European Literature (Würth-Preis für Europäische Literatur), the Würth Prize of Jeunesses Musicales Germany (Würth-Preis der Jeunesses Musicales Deutschland). Since 1993, Würth has awarded the Robert Jacobsen Prize to contemporary visual artists. In addition, the Würth Foundation engages in school and university funding. In 2005, the Künzelsau College of Applied Sciences of the University of Heilbronn was renamed Reinhold Würth University.

The Würth Collection comprises over 18,000 works from the 15th century to modern and contemporary art, primarily paintings and sculptures. It ranks among the greatest European private art collections. The works of art are regularly displayed to the public in five museums in Germany and ten associated galleries of the Würth Group across Europe, including Kunsthalle Würth and Johanniterkirche in Schwäbisch Hall in Germany, Museum Würth and Museum Würth 2 in Künzelsau in Germany, the Art Forum Würth Capena in Italy, the Musée Würth France Erstein in France and the Museo Würth La Rioja in Spain. In Switzerland, Würth maintains Forum Würth Arlesheim, Forum Würth Chur and Würth Haus Rorschach. Admission is free.

Würth is the organizer of the Würth Open-Air Festival, an annual music festival in Künzelsau. The Würth Philharmoniker orchestra was founded in Künzelsau in 2017 by Reinhold Würth Musikstiftung.

Würth and sports

NASCAR

Beginning in the 2012 season, Würth became a primary sponsor in seven Nationwide Series races on the #12 Team Penske Dodge/Ford. From the 2014 season to the 2022 season, Würth was a primary sponsor in four NASCAR Cup Series races of Brad Keselowski of Team Penske's #2 Ford Fusion. Beginning in the 2023 season, Würth returned to the #12 as a primary sponsor in four NASCAR Cup Series races of Ryan Blaney of Team Penske's #12 Ford Mustang.

Football (Soccer)

Bundesliga
Würth is an official partner of the German Football Association (DFB). Since 2022, the Würth brand has been featured at the international matches of the  German men's national team, the women's national team, and the U21 team. In addition, Würth cooperates with ten clubs in the German Bundesliga: FC Bayern Munich, Borussia Dortmund, VfB Stuttgart, Bayer Leverkusen, Hertha BSC Berlin, RB Leipzig, Werder Bremen, SC Freiburg, Mainz 05, and Hamburger SV.

International
Würth has been sponsor on the uniforms of referees and their assistants in La Liga, Spain's premier football league for the last several years. Würth has also been sponsor on the uniform for icelandic top division club   Fylkir since 2017 and French top division club RC Strasbourg Alsace.

Professional cycling
Since 2000, Würth has been a strong supporter of professional bicycle road racing. Prior to 2005, Würth helped sponsor the ONCE-Eroski Pro Cycling Team. Then in 2005,  Würth became one of the team's primary sponsors for the Liberty Seguros-Würth Cycling Team.  In 2006, the company continued its support through the Astana-Würth Cycling Team.

In addition, the Würth Group has served as the presenting sponsor for the 2005 and 2006 Tour de Suisse (Tour of Switzerland).

Basketball
Würth has been sponsor of Virtus Roma in Italy, in 2001-2002 season for the Italian League of Basketball.

Ice hockey
Würth has sponsored various ice hockey team and events, in particular Italian league mainstays HC Bolzano, who won the 1994-95 Cup of the European Leagues as HC Bolzano Würth. Würth also sponsored the Canadian team at the 2013 Spengler Cup  and 2016 Spengler Cup hockey tournament.

Würth is also the sponsor of the ice palace "WürthArena" in Egna, Italy.

Formula One
For the 2008 season, Würth supplied tools and fasteners to Panasonic Toyota Racing and the company's logo featured in the pit garage, on team trucks and on all official communication.

Formula E
For the inaugural Formula E 2014 season, a new FIA championship for electrically powered cars,  Wurth Electronik became technology partner to the only German racing team, ABT Schaeffler Audi Sport. The company's logo features on the nose of the team cars, in the pit garage, on team trucks and on all official communication. After the successful start of the racing season, Würth Elektronik extended its sponsorship agreement with ABT for a further three years.

DTM
Since 2000 season, Würth is an official brake fluid, radiator fluid, supplied tools and fasteners of Deutsche Tourenwagen Masters from 2000 to 2010 and exclusively Audi Sport DTM's brake fluid, radiator fluid, supplied tools and fasteners supplier since 2000.

V8 Supercars
Since the start of the 2015 season, Würth have been in a long term, strategic arrangement with V8 Supercars team, Dick Johnson Racing/Team Penske. The new livery was launched at the support race to the Australian Formula One Grand Prix with Marcos Ambrose as driver and Scott Pye forthwith racing in the colours in select races for the rest of the season.

References

External links
 

Companies based in Baden-Württemberg
German brands
Manufacturing companies of Germany